Ivan Joseph Jones (born November  1, 1940), known professionally as Joe Jones or Boogaloo Joe Jones,  is an American jazz guitarist.

Discography

As leader
 Introducing the Psychedelic Soul Jazz Guitar of Joe Jones [AKA The Mindbender] (Prestige PR 7557, 1968; reissued on BGP/Ace in 1993)
 My Fire! More of the Psychedelic Soul Jazz Guitar of Joe Jones (Prestige PR 7613, 1968; reissued on BGP/Ace in 1993)
 Boogaloo Joe (Prestige PR 7697, 1969) -with Rusty Bryant, Sonny Phillips
 Right On Brother (Prestige PR 7766, 1970) -with Rusty Bryant, Charles Earland
 No Way! (Prestige PR 10004, 1971) -with Grover Washington Jr., Sonny Phillips, Butch Cornell
 What It Is (Prestige PR 10035, 1971) -with Grover Washington Jr., Butch Cornell
 Snake Rhythm Rock (Prestige PR 10056, 1973; reissued on BGP/Ace in 1992) -with Rusty Bryant, Butch Cornell
 Black Whip (Prestige PR 10072, 1973; reissued on BGP/Ace in 1992)
 Sweetback (Joka LPN 6007, 1976; reissued on Luv N' Haight/Ubiquity in 1995)
 Legends Of Acid Jazz: Boogaloo Joe Jones (Prestige, 1996) (compilation of Boogaloo Joe + Right On Brother)
 Legends Of Acid Jazz: Boogaloo Joe Jones, Vol. 2 (Prestige, 1998) (compilation of No Way! + What It Is)

As sideman
With Rusty Bryant 
 Night Train Now! (Prestige PR 7735)
With Billy Hawks 
 The New Genius of the Blues (Prestige PR 7501)
With Richard "Groove" Holmes 
 Spicy! (Prestige PR 7493)
With Willis Jackson 
 Gatorade (Prestige MPP 2516, 1971 [rel. 1982])
 The Gator Horn (Muse MR 5146, 1977)
 Lockin' Horns (Muse MR 5200, 1978 [rel. 1981])
With Harold Mabern 
 Greasy Kid Stuff! (Prestige PR 7764)
With Houston Person
 Soul Dance! (Prestige PR 7621)
With Sonny Phillips 
 Sure 'Nuff (Prestige PR 7737)

References

External links

Living people

1940 births

Soul-jazz guitarists
Jazz-funk guitarists
Hard bop guitarists
Prestige Records artists